Cochin is a port city in India.

Cochin may also refer to:

Geography
 Kingdom of Cochin, a former feudal city-state on Malabar Coast, India
 Cochinchina, former name used by Europeans for Vietnam, especially its Southern part
 Cochin, Saskatchewan, Canada, a Resort Village in Saskatchewan, Canada

People with the surname
 Charles-Nicolas Cochin the Elder (1688–1754), French engraver
 Charles Nicolas Cochin (1715–1790), French engraver, designer, writer, and painter; son of the prior
 Pierre-Suzanne-Augustin Cochin (1823–1872), French politician and writer
 Denys Cochin, French politician and writer
 Augustin Cochin (politician) (1823–1872), French politician and writer
 Augustin Cochin (historian) (1876–1916), French historian and grandson of the prior
 Jean-Denis Cochin (1726–1783), French Catholic priest

Other uses
 Cochin (chicken), a breed of chicken known for its thick plumage
 Hôpital Cochin, a famous hospital in Paris, France
 Cochin (typeface), a typeface designed in 1912
 Cochin ware, a type of Chinese pottery
 Cochin Jews

French-language surnames